Tripterocalyx crux-maltae is a species of flowering plant in the four o'clock family known by the common names Lassen sandverbena and Kellogg's sand-verbena.

Distribution
It is native to a section of the Great Basin straddling the far northern California-Nevada border, where it grows in sagebrush habitat. It is nearly endemic to Nevada, with only one occurrence present in Lassen County, California.

Description
Tripterocalyx crux-maltae grows in a patch on the ground, the multibranched stems spreading not more than 30 centimeters long. The stems are reddish in color and coated in sticky glandular hairs.

Each leaf has a fleshy green blade up to 7 centimeters long which is borne on a long petiole. The herbage is sticky in texture.

The inflorescence is a head of several elongated flowers borne on long, glandular pedicels all attached at the small central receptacle. Each trumpet-shaped purple or magenta flower may be up to 2.5 centimeters in length and over a centimeter wide at the face of the corolla, with 4 or 5 lobes.

The fruit has wide, thin, net-veined or ribbed wings and hairy surfaces.

References

External links
Jepson Manual Treatment for Tripterocalyx crux-maltae
Flora of North America
Tripterocalyx crux-maltae — UC Photo gallery

Nyctaginaceae
Flora of California
Flora of Nevada
Flora of the Great Basin
Flora of the California desert regions
Natural history of Lassen County, California
Plants described in 1863
Flora without expected TNC conservation status